The Oregonia Formation is a geologic formation in Ohio. It preserves fossils dating back to the Ordovician period.

See also

 List of fossiliferous stratigraphic units in Ohio

References
 

Ordovician Kentucky
Ordovician Indiana
Ordovician Ohio
Ordovician southern paleotemperate deposits